Robert Clerk was a British engineer officer who served in the War of the Austrian Succession and the Seven Years' War.

Robert Clerk may also refer to:

Sir Robert Maxwell Clerk, 11th Baronet, of the Clerk baronets
Robert Clerk (MP), in 1386, MP for Truro

See also
Clerk (disambiguation)
Robert Clark (disambiguation)
Robert Clarke (disambiguation)